Ska-P is the first album by the Spanish ska punk band Ska-P, released in 1994. The song "Como un Rayo" is a tribute to the football club Rayo Vallecano.

Track list

Personnel 
 Pulpul – vocals, guitar
 Nuno – drums
 Depardieu – bass
 Yanclas – guitar
 Rizos – keyboard

External links 
Ska-P's official website

1994 albums
Ska-P albums